"Earth Song" is a song by the American singer Michael Jackson for his ninth studio album, HIStory: Past, Present and Future, Book I (1995). It was written by Jackson and produced by Jackson, David Foster and Bill Bottrell. Epic Records released on November 7, 1995, as the album's third single.

"Earth Song" is a ballad that incorporates elements of blues, gospel and opera. Though Jackson had previously released socially conscious songs such as "We Are the World", "Man in the Mirror" and "Heal the World", "Earth Song" was his first to overtly discuss the environment and animal welfare. It was accompanied by a lavish music video which was shot in four geographical regions, centered on the destruction and rebirth of Earth, and went on to receive a Grammy nomination in 1997. 

"Earth Song" reached number one in the UK, where it was the 1995 Christmas number one. It also topped the charts in Germany, Iceland, Scotland, Spain, Sweden, and Switzerland while peaking at number two in France, Ireland, and the Netherlands. Jackson received recognition from various animal and environmental organizations.

In 2011, the song was paired with the poem "Planet Earth" (previously released on Michael Jackson's This Is It, in 2009) and released as a song in the remix album Immortal.

Production
Jackson wrote "Earth Song" in an Austrian Hotel during the Bad World Tour under the working title "What About Us", allegedly on June 1st, 1988 at the Vienna Marriott. Jackson wanted to create a song that was lyrically deep, with an emotional message, but was melodically simple, so the whole world, particularly non-English-speaking fans, could sing along.

"Earth Song" was produced by Jackson, David Foster and Bill Bottrell. Andraé Crouch's Choir and Jackson engage in a call-and-response chant in the climax.

According to bassist Guy Pratt, Jackson was recovering from plastic surgery at the time of Pratt's recording and hid under a mixing desk in the studio. Jackson passed instructions for Pratt to an assistant, who pretended that Jackson was not in the room.

Composition
"Earth Song" is a ballad that incorporates elements of blues, gospel and opera.

Jackson describes the dire situation that mankind has caused, ranging from war to devastation to animals and Earth itself.  Jackson calls on people to remember the Earth is their inheritance from God via their ancestor Abraham. "What about death again" reminds all to think about eternal death, asking people to check their heart for repentance, or to see if they really cared at all. Having disassociated himself from being one of Jehovah's Witnesses, Jackson simplified his faith to focus on the Biblical Jesus Christ until his death.

Reception
"Earth Song" received mostly positive reviews from music critics. A reviewer from Contra Costa Times called it "a bit sappy and overblown", but also acknowledged that it was "epic" and destined to be a "massive smash hit". James Masterton for Dotmusic described it as a "towering gospel track". Ledger-Enquirer observed that it "enjoys the same kind of subtlety, building to a dramatic call-and-response finish with the Andraé Crouch Choir". Pan-European magazine Music & Media declared it as an "ecological anthem", stating that "even without the delightful arrangements (tentative piano, jazzy guitar licks, nature noises), the strong composition would have been a sure thing for the top of the EHR and ACE charts." Music Week rated it five out of five, picking it as Single of the Week. They added, "This will be huge. Already a favourite from HIStory, it builds from a tweeting birds/strummed harp intro into a no-excess-barred epic, but is beautiful all the same." The Philadelphia Inquirer deemed it "a healing, rhythmic ballad that evokes religious imagery". Michael Mehle of Rocky Mountain News said the finale is "anthemic" and a "powerful gospel opus". James Hunter of Rolling Stone stated, "The slow blues-operatic 'Earth Song' for all its noble sentiments, sounds primarily like a showpiece". The Sacramento Bee described Jackson's vocal performance as "cool". A reviewer from San Jose Mercury News called it "flat" and "whiny", believing Jackson had already experimented with these concepts earlier in his career.

In 2017, ShortList's Dave Fawbert listed the song as containing "one of the greatest key changes in music history". Jackson received the Genesis Award: 1995 Doris Day Music Award, given each year for animal sensitivity.

Commercial performance
In the United Kingdom, "Earth Song" debuted at number one on the UK Singles Chart, where it remained for six weeks throughout December 1995 — beating the U2/Brian Eno project Passengers to win the Christmas number one spot — and into early 1996. During its stay at number one, "Earth Song" kept the first single released by the Beatles in 25 years, "Free as a Bird", off the number one position as well as other bookmaker favourites "Wonderwall" by Oasis and "It's Oh So Quiet" by Björk. In early December, bookmakers correctly predicted that Jackson would keep the Beatles off the top position and go on to attain the Christmas number-one single. It went on to sell 1,270,000 copies in the nation as of August 2018.
The song also took the number one position in Iceland, Lithuania, Spain, Sweden and Switzerland, peaking within the top five in almost every European state.
In Germany, it was Jackson's first single to reach No. 1 on the German Singles Chart and held the summit for 5 consecutive weeks.

The song was only released to radio in the US, appearing on the Hot Dance Music/Club Play chart (for the remix version of 1996). In 2006, "Earth Song" reached number 55 on the European Hot 100 Singles chart, following the Visionary: The Video Singles campaign, whereby 20 of Jackson's hit singles from the 1980s to the 1990s were reissued in several European countries.

Live performances
Earth Song was first performed on November 4, 1995, on the German TV program Wetten, dass..?, along with Dangerous. The next performance of the song was at Brit Awards 1996 on February 19, 1996. During the performance, singer Jarvis Cocker ran onto the stage while Jackson was dangling off the edge of a crane. He lifted his shirt, pretended to break wind and gave Jackson the V sign. The 1996 World Music Awards was the next performance of the song on May 8, 1996.

During the ending of the song, Jackson sang the line, "Tell me what about it", which was not heard in the song. On July 16, 1996, Jackson performed Earth Song at the Brunei Royal Concert at Jerudong Park Amphitheatre in Bandar Seri Begawan. Similar to the World Music Awards performance, Michael sang the line, "Tell me what about it". The song was also performed on Jackson's HIStory World Tour from September 1996 to October 1997.

It was later performed at the MJ & Friends concerts in June 1999. During the Munich performance on June 27, 1999, the middle section of the bridge collapsed into the air and came falling down instead of pausing in mid-air. The fall caused severe back pain to Jackson. After the concert, Jackson was rushed to a hospital.

The song was also planned for his This Is It comeback concerts in London at The O2 Arena. But canceled due to Jackson's death on June 25, 2009. This was the last song Jackson ever performed, having rehearsed it at Staples Center on June 24, 2009, preparing for This Is It, hours before his death.

Brit Awards incident

On February 19, 1996, Jackson performed "Earth Song" at Brit Awards 1996 in the United Kingdom; he was there to collect a special "Artist of a Generation" award. Jackson sang while dangling off the edge of a high-rise crane elevator, which he had used the year before while performing it on the German TV show Wetten Dass. Below, a chorus of backing performers joined in and many began to embrace Jackson upon his descent.

During the performance, singer Jarvis Cocker ran onstage without permission, lifted his shirt and pretended to break wind, before giving Jackson the V sign. Cocker was there with his band Pulp, who had been nominated for three Brit awards. He was questioned by police over claims he had assaulted some of the child performers. A video provided by an undentified source showed that it was one of Jackson's crew who had barged into the children, not Cocker, and the charges of assault were dropped.

Cocker said that he found the performance offensive, claiming that Jackson had portrayed himself as Christ-like and could do as he pleased because of his immense wealth and power. However, he clarified that his actions weren't personally against Jackson himself, just the performance. He stated that he admired Jackson as a performer, proclaiming that: "He can dance, [...] anybody who invents the moonwalk is alright by me". Jackson condemned Cocker's behavior as "disgusting and cowardly". The incident is referred to in the book Politics and Popular Culture by John Street, Professor of Politics at the University of East Anglia. He says:

But to read popular culture as a straight-forward – or at least typical – political text is to take a very narrow view of its meaning, and hence of its political message(s). As we have noted, the text's meaning will depend on how it is heard and read. Michael Jackson may have intended his "Earth Song" as an exercise in compassion; others – like Jarvis Cocker – saw it quite differently. One reason these alternative readings emerge is because of the way the performance of popular culture engages more than a literal text, it employs gestures and symbols, tones of voice, looks and glances, all of which might tell a different story.

Despite his dislike of Jackson's Brit Awards performance, in a 2012 interview with The Guardian Cocker said he was still a fan of 'Earth Song': “It is a right good song, obviously".

2010 Grammy Awards performance
The song, along with a 3-D short film that was to be featured in Jackson's series of comeback concerts This Is It was performed as a tribute to Jackson. Jennifer Hudson, Carrie Underwood, Smokey Robinson, Celine Dion and Usher all sang the song together, while the video played in the background. The film was shown in its original 3-D format during the broadcast.

Target provided free 3-D glasses to customers a week before the Grammy Awards. Paris and Prince Jackson, Jackson's oldest children, appeared shortly after the performance to accept Jackson's Lifetime Achievement Award, where they both gave a short speech. This was the first time the children had spoken publicly since the memorial service that was held for Jackson on July 7, 2009.

Music video

The music video for "Earth Song", directed by fine art photographer Nick Brandt, was expensive and well-received; it gained the 1995 Doris Day Music Award at the Genesis Awards and a Grammy nomination for Best Music Video, Short Form in 1997. The production had an environmental theme, showing images of animal cruelty, deforestation, pollution, poaching,  poverty and war. Jackson and the world's people unite in a spiritual chant—"Earth Song"—which summons a force that heals the world. Using special effects, time is reversed so that life returns, war ends and the forests regrow. The video closes with a request for donations to Jackson's Heal the World Foundation. The clip was shown infrequently in the United States.

The video was filmed in four geographic regions (Americas, Europe and Africa). The first location was the Amazon rainforest, where a large part was destroyed a week after the video's completion. Natives of the region appeared in the video and were not actors. The second scene was a war zone in Karlovac, Croatia, with famous Serbian actor Slobodan Dimitrijević and the residents of the area. The third location was Tanzania, which incorporated scenes of illegal poaching and hunting into the video. No animals were harmed in the making of the "Earth Song", as the footage came from documentary archives. The final location was in Warwick, New York, where a safe forest fire was simulated in a corn field.

The video was also included on the video albums: HIStory on Film, Volume II, Number Ones and Michael Jackson's Vision.

Track listing

 UK CD1
 "Earth Song (Radio Edit)" – 4:58
 "Earth Song (Hani's Club Experience)" – 7:55
 "Michael Jackson DMC Megamix" – 11:18

 UK CD2
 "Earth Song (Radio Edit)" – 4:58
 "Earth Song (Hani's Radio Experience)" – 3:33
 "Wanna Be Startin' Somethin' (Brothers in Rhythm Mix)" – 7:35
 "Wanna Be Startin' Somethin' (TommyD's Main Mix)" – 7:40

 Earth Song (Hani Remixes)
 "Earth Song (Hani's Around The World Experience)" – 14:47
 "Earth Song (Hani's Club Experience)" – 7:55
 "Earth Song (Hani's Extended Radio Experience)" – 4:32
 "Earth Song (Hani's Radio Experience)" – 3:33

The DMC Megamix is a medley of Bad, Billie Jean, Black or White, Don't Stop 'Til You Get Enough, Remember the Time, Rock with You, Scream, Thriller and Wanna Be Startin' Somethin'.

Charts

Weekly charts

Year-end charts

Certifications

Personnel
 Michael Jackson: lead vocals, backing vocals, keyboards, synthesizers, producer, vocal arrangements, rhythm arrangements
 Andraé Crouch, Sandra Crouch, and Andraé Crouch Choir: backing vocals
 David Foster: producer, keyboards, synthesizers, orchestral arrangements, vocal arrangements, rhythm arrangements
 David Paich: piano, keyboards, synthesizers
 Bill Bottrell: co-producer, guitar
 Michael Thompson: guitar
 Guy Pratt: bass guitar
 Steve Ferrone: drums
 Bruce Swedien: recording engineer, mixing
 Bill Ross: orchestration
 Steve Porcaro: synthesizer programming
 Co-performance by London Philharmonic Orchestra (Orchestral Mix only)
 Orchestral arrangement by James Horner (Orchestral Mix only)

See also
 Earth anthem
 List of best-selling singles in Germany
 List of million-selling singles in the United Kingdom

References

Bibliography

 George, Nelson (2004). Michael Jackson: The Ultimate Collection booklet. Sony BMG.
 

1990s ballads
1995 singles
1995 songs
Michael Jackson songs
La India songs
Anti-war songs
Epic Records singles
Environmental songs
European Hot 100 Singles number-one singles
Number-one singles in Germany
Irish Singles Chart number-one singles
Number-one singles in Iceland
Number-one singles in Switzerland
Number-one singles in Spain
Pop ballads
Contemporary R&B ballads
UK Singles Chart number-one singles
Songs written by Michael Jackson
Song recordings produced by Michael Jackson
Song recordings produced by Bill Bottrell
Song recordings produced by David Foster
Gospel songs
Number-one singles in Scotland
Christmas number-one singles in the United Kingdom
Songs about climate change
Music videos directed by Nick Brandt